Matias Caseras (born March 20, 1992) is a Uruguayan football player who plays for Plaza Colonia.

References

External links

1992 births
Living people
Uruguayan footballers
J2 League players
Uruguayan Primera División players
Uruguayan Segunda División players
Kyoto Sanga FC players
Club Plaza Colonia de Deportes players
Association football midfielders